Mowaia Bashir Koko (born 17 April 1986) is a Sudanese international footballer who plays for Al-Hilal as a defender. He previously played for Al-Ittihad Wad Medani and transferred to the Blue waves in June 2012 .

International career

International goals
Scores and results list Sudan's goal tally first.

References

External links
 

1986 births
Living people
Sudanese footballers
Sudan international footballers
2012 Africa Cup of Nations players
Al-Hilal Club (Omdurman) players
Association football fullbacks